Moembe is a town in Djambala District in the Plateaux Department of the Republic of the Congo. It lies in the Lefini Reserve on the Lefini River, south of Etsouali and on the N2 road. The primary language for occupants here is French, the nearest city is Kikwit at 170km.

References

Populated places in the Republic of the Congo